Beijing Benz (officially Beijing Benz Automotive Co., Ltd) is an automotive manufacturing company headquartered in Beijing, China, and a joint venture between BAIC Motor and Mercedes-Benz Group.

It was originally established in January 1984 as a joint-venture with BAIC Motor of Beijing, China and American Motors Corporation (AMC) of Michigan, USA therefore named as Beijing Jeep Corporation. It was the first Chinese auto-making joint venture with a Western partner. The joint venture continued after AMC was acquired by Chrysler in 1987, when Chrysler merged with German automaker Daimler-Benz AG in 1998 and finally ended their partnership in 2005.

History

The history of this company goes back to Beijing Jeep Corporation (BJC), which was the first Sino-foreign automobile joint venture in China. It became a prototype for future cooperative projects and BJC became a test case revealing problems, both political and economic, that would appear for other investors the Chinese hoped to attract.

The current name, Beijing Benz, was established in 2005 and the enterprise now owned by Beiqi and Daimler AG.

American Motors

Beijing Benz grew out of what was originally the Beijing Jeep Corporation, China's first Sino-western automotive joint venture having been established in 1984 with American Motors Corporation.

American Motors began negotiations in 1979 to sell its vehicles in China and gain access to then low-cost Chinese labor. The Chinese wanted more-modern automotive technology; Beijing Jeep suited the needs of both parties and produced the American Motors Jeep Cherokee (XJ) in Beijing. While talks began in the late 1970s, operation started in 1985. The initial investment by AMC was $8 million. Assembly of the Cherokee continued after Chrysler purchased American Motors as did production of the classic Beijing BJ212-based SUVs.

Beijing Jeep has since become well known as an example of early FDI in China. Its pitfalls and successes are pored over in case studies, and such academic reports sometimes compare the marketing strategy of Beijing Jeep with that of Shanghai Volkswagen, another early Sino-foreign joint venture.

Chrysler
When Chrysler purchased American Motors in 1987, its Jeep brand came with an unexpected boon, Beijing Jeep. A few Chrysler models were subsequently added to the Chinese company's product line including the Jeep Grand Cherokee, Mitsubishi Pajero Sport, and the Mitsubishi Outlander, as well as some Beijing Jeep-branded, locally developed vehicles. Chrysler no longer had any ownership in Beijing Jeep as of early 2009 due to the failure of its attempt to acquire the maker of Mercedes-Benz models. That German company, Daimler, kept the profitable China manufacturing operation for itself once it was clear the merger was a failed prospect. Domestic manufacture of Jeep-branded vehicles ceased in 2006. Newer Jeep models are now being produced at a joint venture between Guangzhou Automobile Group and Fiat Chrysler Automobiles, current owner of the Chrysler and Jeep brands, however.

Daimler AG
During Chrysler's short-lived partnership with Daimler AG, maker of Mercedes-Benz cars, production at Beijing Jeep was expanded to include Mercedes-Benz-branded products. Its legal name was changed to Beijing Benz-DaimlerChrysler Automotive Co Ltd, with then German Chancellor Gerhard Schroeder in attendance at the 2004 naming ceremony. While Chrysler was removed from the company in 2009, it remained in its legal name for several more years.

Mercedes-Benz was firstly involved in a short lived joint venture from 1987 until 1988 with FAW (First Automobile Works) where 828 vehicles were produced consisting of the Mercedes-Benz (W123) 200 and 230E Lang, most of which were made from  CKD kits. Incidentally, Daimler had previously cooperated with FAW Group to produce the then-recently discontinued Mercedes-Benz W123 (200 and 230E) sedans although these did not prove popular. Between January 1988 and sometimes in 1990, a mere 828 units were assembled in Changchun most of which were 230s. A few dozen of the long wheelbase 230E (V123) were among the cars assembled.

It was later established in August 2005 where Mercedes Benz was reintroduced to the Chinese market as Beijing Benz and assembled its first car, a Mercedes-Benz E-Class in December 2005.

The company started producing the Mercedes-Benz E-Class locally in 2006 and the C-Class in 2008. Manufacture of Chrysler-branded models continued until at least 2008. This included the 300C and Sebring, which were both locally produced and imported.

Prior to 2010, the E-Class was assembled from knock-down kits with a low localization rate of about 30%.

Shortly afterwards, in 2017, Beijing Benz began manufacturing 58% of the parts for the Mercedes-Benz GLA, Mercedes-Benz GLB and Mercedes-Benz GLC in China for those parts to be exported afterwards for assembly. 

As well as Beijing, there is also a subsidiary in Fuzhou, Fujian under the name Fujian Benz established in 2007 where they have produced light commercial vehicles such as the Vito since April 2011 and the Sprinter in November 2011. The Viano commenced in the same month as the Vito and ended production in April 2015. The V-Class was launched in March 2016.

Since the 2014 sales of Chrysler and Jeep to FIAT, the Jeep-like vehicles and their derivatives have been produced by the BAIC subsidiary Beijing Automobile Works Co., Ltd. (BAW).

As of 2016, Beijing Benz assembles and manufactures the Mercedes-Benz E-Class (long wheelbase), and C-Class in China.

Operations
Beijing Benz has a production base at the Beijing Economic & Technological Development Area. Another plant opened in 2010. This opening may have increased potential Beijing Benz production capacity to 300,000 units/year. Such unit counts may consider engines and automobiles as discrete. A future engine-making production base is scheduled to become operational in 2013.

While Beijing Benz does not produce all the Mercedes-branded autos sold on the Chinese market. Some Mercedes offerings, the S-Class for example, are imported by Mercedes-Benz (China) Ltd.

As of 2009, Beijing Benz products, alongside those of several other makes, are purchased for use by Chinese State officials such as ministers and provincial heads.

Sales in 2010 were expected to reach 50,000 cars, but total Mercedes-Benz sales in China including imports were near 150,000. In 2008, Beijing Benz's production capacity was estimated at 100,000 units/year although that figure may consider engines and vehicles as discrete, and the company was likely able to produce only half that number of whole vehicles.

Models

Current production

Former production (Beijing Jeep)

Former production (Beijing Benz)

Mercedes-Benz production under First Automobile Works

See also
Beijing Automobile Works (BAW)
Beijing Automotive Industry Holding Co Ltd (BAIC)
List of automobiles manufactured by Beijing Jeep Corporation

References

External links
  

American Motors
BAIC Group joint ventures
Car manufacturers of China
Mercedes-Benz Group joint ventures
Manufacturing companies based in Beijing
Vehicle manufacturing companies established in 1984
Chinese companies established in 1984
Chinese-foreign joint-venture companies